Michelle Lauge Quaade is a road cyclist from Denmark. She participated at the 2011 UCI Road World Championships.

References

External links
 profile at Procyclingstats.com

1991 births
Danish female cyclists
Living people
Place of birth missing (living people)